Sir William Mulock Secondary School is a secondary school located at 705 Columbus Way, off Mulock Drive in Newmarket, Ontario, Canada. It is one of four high schools in Newmarket under the jurisdiction of the York Region District School Board (a fifth school, Sacred Heart Catholic High School, is under the York Catholic District School Board) and currently educates students from Grades 9 to 12. It opened in December 2001. Prior to that, most of its students went to Newmarket High School. The founding students have demonstrated the initiative of character traits by creating original 'character feathers' which can be found in the main hall.

The Newmarket Citizens' Band conducts rehearsals at Sir William Mulock Secondary School.

Background
The school is named after Sir William Mulock, an important figure in Canadian politics at the end of the 19th century, leading into the 20th century. He was one of the most prominent residents of Armitage, the first community established in King that has since been subsumed by Newmarket.

The founding principal of SWMSS (Sir William Mulock Secondary School) was Reet Patterson. Carmen Spiteri-Johnson is the current principal, and approximately 1200 students attended the school during the 2010/11 school year.

Sir William Mulock Secondary School offers a variety of programs in Business, Earth & Space Sciences, Computer Studies, Engineering, Woodworking, Co-operative Education (available for grades 11 and 12), Fashion, English, Family Studies (including fashion and lifestyle, etc), Geography, Law & Politics, History, Biology, Medical Studies, Mathematics, Modern languages - French, Spanish, Health care, Music, Orchestral Studies, Yoga, technology, Physical Education, Special Education, Technical Studies, HPA (high-performance athlete), Drama and Visual Arts.

Mulock also offers many sports teams and clubs for students; such as Walking In Nature club.

Feeder schools
The main feeder schools for Sir William Mulock Secondary School are:
 Rogers Public School
 Crossland Public School
 Clearmeadow Public School
 Armitage Village Public School
 Terry Fox Public School

Blended Learning
Starting the 2010/2011 year, the Grade 9 students of the school participated in a new program. Students are now required to bring netbooks/laptops with wireless capabilities to classes throughout the year. After a successful first year for the program, it was implemented in grades 10, 11, and 12. This model is now being implemented at several other York Region District School Board schools.

This program was introduced to modernize teaching and learning methods by blending traditional and technological teaching strategies.

Dress code
This is a public school therefore, the use of uniforms is not required. There is however, a dress code policy. Such inappropriate clothing includes short shorts, gang colors, and headbands over an inch thick. As of September 8, 2015, hats are allowed to be worn indoors.

School mascot
Sir William Mulock Secondary School's mascot is 'Billy the Raven'.

Notable alumni 
Connor McDavid, captain for the Edmonton Oilers

See also
List of high schools in Ontario
York Region District School Board
Newmarket, Ontario

Notes

York Region District School Board
High schools in the Regional Municipality of York
Education in Newmarket, Ontario
Educational institutions established in 2001
2001 establishments in Ontario